The men's all-events competition at the 2006 Asian Games in Doha was held from 3 December to 8 December 2006 at Qatar Bowling Centre.

All-events scores are compiled by totalling series scores from the singles, doubles, trios and team events.

Schedule
All times are Arabia Standard Time (UTC+03:00)

Results

References 

Results at ABF Website
Results

External links
Official Website

Men's all-events